This is a list of notable people who were born in or closely associated with the American state of Iowa. People not born in Iowa are marked with §.

A

 Dudley W. Adams, horticulturalist
 John T. Adams, former Republican committee head
 Julie Adams, actress
 Trev Alberts, football player
 Bess Streeter Aldrich, author
 James Allen, engineer
 Fran Allison, television personality
 William B. Allison, politician
 Betty Baxter Anderson, author
 Lew Anderson, actor
 Rudolph Martin Anderson, explorer
 Marc Andreessen, software engineer
 Pat Angerer, football player
 Cap Anson, baseball player
 Brynild Anundsen, publisher
 Appanoose, 19th-century Meskwaki chief
 Lloyd Appleton, Olympic freestyle wrestler
 Samuel Z. Arkoff, film producer
 Herbert W. Armstrong, religious leader
 Tom Arnold, actor
 Matthew Ashford, actor
 Winifred Asprey, mathematician
 John Vincent Atanasoff, § inventor
 Jim Aton, jazz musician, composer, singer

B

 John Babcock, Olympic freestyle wrestler
 Michele Bachmann, politician
 Stan Bahnsen, baseball player
 John O. Bailey, judge
 Bil Baird, puppeteer
 Betsy Baker, actress
 Nathaniel B. Baker, politician
 Alvin Baldus, politician
 Charlie Bales, soccer player
 Brad Banks, athlete
 Hal C. Banks, labor leader
 Jill Banner, actress
 Antonine Barada, folk hero
 Roger Barkley, broadcaster
 Harrison Barnes, athlete
 Bob Barr, politician
 Douglas Barr, actor, writer, and director
 David Barrett, football player
 Steve Bartkowski, football player
 Robert Bartley, editor of The Wall Street Journal
 Clint Barton, fictional character
 Theodore J. Bauer, scientist
 Lansing Hoskins Beach, Army officer
 Bennett Bean, artist
 Carl L. Becker, historian
 Bix Beiderbecke, jazz musician
 William W. Belknap
 Brian Bell, musician
 Alfred S. Bennett, Army general and U.S. Secretary of War
 Duane Benson, athlete
 Shawn Bentler, murderer
 Matt Bentley, professional wrestler
 Christian Beranek, writer, actor, and producer
 Leo Beranek, acoustician
 Bill Bergan, coach
 Eddie Berlin, athlete
 Dan Bern, musician
 S. Torriano Berry, film producer, writer, director
 Jay Berwanger, football player
 Stanley Biber, physician
 Greg Biekert, football player
 Leo Binz, § Roman Catholic archbishop
 Joe Bisenius, athlete
 Richard Pike Bissell, author
 Nate Bjorkgren, basketball coach
 Black Hawk, § Native American chief
 Casey Blake, baseball player
 Gordon Blake, military general
 Donald G. Bloesch, theologian
 Isabel Bloom, artist
 Scott Bloomquist, auto racer
 Mike Blouin, politician
 Lisa Bluder, coach
 Mike Boddicker, baseball player
 Bill Bogaard, politician
 Tommy Bolin, musician
 Norman Borlaug, agricultural scientist and Nobel Laureate
 Rob Borsellino, writer
 Ryan Bowen, athlete
 Thomas M. Bowen, politician
 Charles Bowers, cartoonist and comic actor
 Lara Flynn Boyle, actress
 Eleanor Hoyt Brainerd, author
 Glen Brand, Olympic freestyle wrestler
 Neville Brand, actor
 Terry Brands, Olympic freestyle wrestler, wrestling coach
 Tom Brands, Olympic freestyle wrestler, wrestling coach
 Terry E. Branstad, politician
 Aaron Brant, athlete
 Charles Wesley Brashares, Methodist bishop
 Titus Bronson, founder of Kalamazoo, Michigan
 Greg Brown, folk musician
 Mace Brown, athlete
 Shannon Brown, country music singer
 Bruce Brubaker, pianist, record producer 
 Rob Bruggeman, athlete
 Bill Bryson, author
 Matt Bullard, athlete
 Ambrose Burke, priest, college president
 Jerry Burke, musician
 Tim Burke, football coach
 Joseph A. A. Burnquist, politician
 Martin Burns, athlete
 Joe Burrow, Heisman Trophy winner
 Jim Burt, sportscaster
 Marion LeRoy Burton, college president
 Harlan J. Bushfield, politician
 Mike Butcher, baseball player
 Frank M. Byrne, politician
 Robert Byrne, author

C

 Samuel Calvin, geologist
 Branden Campbell, bassist for Neon Trees
 Donald L. Campbell, chemist
 Marjorie Cameron, actress and occultist
 Macdonald Carey, actor
 Chris Carney, politician
 Wallace Carothers, chemist
 Allan Carpenter, author
 Sabin Carr, athlete
 Tommy Carroll, criminal
 Johnny Carson, television personality
 Jordan Carstens, athlete
 Louise Carver, actress
 Thomas Nixon Carver, economics professor
 Frank T. Cary, businessman
 Landon Cassill, auto racer
 Carrie Chapman Catt, suffragette
 Thomas Cech, chemist and Nobel Laureate
 Matt Chatham, football player
 The Cherry Sisters, vaudevillians
 Norton P. Chipman, politician, judge
 Tom Churchill, broadcaster
 Bernard A. Clarey, admiral
 Dallas Clark, § football player
 Laurel Blair Salton Clark, astronaut
 Rush Clark, politician
 Fred Clarke, baseball Hall of Famer
 Frederick G. Clausen, architect
 Jeff Clement, athlete
 Ron Clements, director and producer
 Scott Clemmensen, athlete
 Buffalo Bill Cody, Wild West showman
 Samuel Cody, aviator
 Harris Coggeshall, athlete
 Danielle Colby
 King Cole, athlete
 Ada Langworthy Collier, poet, writer 	
 Chris Collins, hockey player
 Max Allan Collins, mystery writer
 Stephen Collins, actor
 Nick Collison, basketball player
 John W. Colloton, healthcare executive
 Steven Colloton, federal judge
 Martin Cone, college president
 Edwin H. Conger, diplomat
 Maurice Connolly, politician
 Paul Conrad, political cartoonist
 Ed Conroy, athlete
 George Cram Cook, author
 Marv Cook, football player
 Jack Coombs, athlete
 Eric Cooper, baseball umpire
 Barclay and Edwin Coppock, followers of John Brown
 Frank Cordaro, activist
 Sarah Corpstein, beauty queen
 John M. Corse, Army general
 Ernie Courtney, athlete
 Paul Coverdell, politician
 Thomas Jefferson Cowie, admiral
 Ryan Cownie, stand-up comedian
 Shawn Crahan, musician
 Roger Craig, football player
 Joe Crail, politician
 Coe I. Crawford, politician
 Francis X. Cretzmeyer, coach
 Joel Crisman, football player
Jim Crotty, athlete
 Julee Cruise, singer and actress
 Frank Cuhel, athlete
 Mariclare Culver, political figure
 Henry J. B. Cummings, politician
 Billy Cundiff, athlete
 Jack Cunningham, screenwriter
 parker crawford  student

D

 Janet Dailey, author
 Bill Daily, actor
 Dick Dale, musician
 Muriel Frances Dana, actress
 Jack Daniels, politician
 Diane D'Aquila, actress
 Sarah Darling, musician
 Geof Darrow, artist
 Dana Davis, actress
 Barry Davis, Olympic freestyle wrestler
 Rebecca Fjelland Davis, author
 Stuart Davis, musician
 Laura Dawn, activist, singer-songwriter, director/producer
 Bud Day, war hero
 Walter Day, businessman
 Darren Daye, athlete
 Lee De Forest, inventor
 Jordan De Jong, athlete
 Henry Clay Dean, preacher, lawyer
 Don DeFore, actor
 W. Edwards Deming, statistician
 Don Denkinger, baseball umpire
 Dave Despain, sports journalist
 Adam Devine, actor
 Aubrey Devine, athlete
 Lester J. Dickinson, politician
 Justin Diercks, auto racer
 Charles Hall Dillon, politician, judge
 Thomas Disch, author
 James Dixon, orchestra conductor
 David M. Dobson, game creator
 Claire Dodd, actress
 Tim Dodd, YouTuber
 Grenville M. Dodge, railroad executive
 Ralph Edward Dodge, religious leader
 Angela Dohrmann, actress
 Ellen Dolan, actress
 Steve Doocy, television journalist
 Russell S. Doughten, filmmaker
 Nicholas Downs, actor
 Joel Dreessen, football player
 Kevin Dresser, collegiate wrestling head coach
 Leanna Field Driftmier, radio personality
 Bobby Driscoll, actor
 Fred Duesenberg, automobile manufacturer
 Randy Duncan, football player
 Francis John Dunn, religious leader
 Lloyd Dunn
 Samuel Grace Dunn, journalist
 Kenneth W. Durant, decorated sailor
 John Durbin, actor
 Tim Dwight, football player

E

 Morgan Earp, Wild West lawman
 Warren Earp, brother of Wyatt Earp
 Abastenia St. Leger Eberle, sculptor
 Zales Ecton, politician
 Paul Eells, sportscaster
 Mamie Eisenhower, former First Lady of the United States
 Cal Eldred, athlete
 Jane Elliott, schoolteacher and activist
 James Ellison, actor
 Eugene Burton Ely, aviator
 Paul Emerick, International rugby player, and coach
 Hope Emerson, actress
 Michael Emerson, actor
 Femi Emiola, actress
 Norman A. Erbe, politician
Joni Ernst, United States Senator for Iowa
 Jane Espenson, TV producer and writer
 Simon Estes, opera singer
 Linda Evans, political activist
 Frank F. Everest, general
 Barton Warren Evermann, ichthyologist

F

 Randy Florke, writer/publisher of interior design book
 Urban Clarence "Red" Faber, baseball player
 Tom Fadden, actor 
 Carole Farley, soprano singer
 Art Farmer, jazz musician
 Sharon Farrell, actress
 Terry Farrell, actress
 James Fee, photographer
 Victor Feguer, convicted murderer
 Chris Fehn, musician
 Margaret Feldner, university president
 Bob Feller, baseball player
 Mary Fels, philanthropist, suffragist, Georgist
 James Ferentz, football player
 Jeremy Ferguson, musician
 Susan Frances Nelson Ferree, journalist, activist, suffragist 	
 Susan Fessenden, activist, social reformer
 Al Feuerbach, track and field athlete
 Romaine Fielding, actor
 Margarita Fischer, actress
 Matt Fish, basketball player
 Freddie Fisher, musician
 Bill Fitch, basketball coach
 Joseph Fitz, naval veteran
 Bridget Flanery, actress
 John Flannagan, priest
 Jack Fleck, golfer
 Frank Jack Fletcher, admiral
 Robert Fletcher, costume designer
 Rich Folkers, baseball player
 Bradbury Foote, screenwriter
 Ben Foster, actor
 Jon Foster, musician
 Judith Ellen Foster, lawyer
 Farrah Franklin, singer
 William Frawley, actor
 John T. Frederick, scholar
 Tanna Frederick, actress
 Joan Freeman, actress
 Bruce French, actor
 George B. French, actor
 Joe Frisco, vaudeville performer
 Virgil Frye, actor, boxer

G

 Dan Gable, Olympic freestyle wrestler, wrestling coach
 Jetseta Gage, kidnap victim
 Robert Gallery, football player
 George Horace Gallup, founder of Gallup Poll
 Viola Garfield, anthropologist
 Jim Garrison, lawyer, judge
 David Garst, farmer, seed manufacturer
 Roswell Garst, farmer, seed manufacturer
 Michael Gartner, journalist
 Joey Gase, NASCAR driver
 Harry Gaspar, baseball player
 James Lorraine Geddes, soldier
 John Getz, actor
 Dick Gibbs, basketball player
 Edward H. Gillette, politician
 Thomas Gilman, Olympic freestyle wrestler
 Owen Gingerich, astronomer
 Annabeth Gish, actress
 Salvatore Giunta, Congressional Medal of Honor recipient
 Fred Glade, baseball player
 Susan Glaspell, playwright
 Dan Goldie, tennis player
 Johnny Gosch, kidnap victim
 Frank Gotch, professional wrestler
 Al Gould, baseball player
 Rick Graf, football player
 Fred Grandy, actor, politician
 Chuck Grassley, Iowa senator
 Paul Gray, musician
 Dick Green, baseball player
 George Greene, Supreme Court justice
 Edna Griffin, civil rights activist
 James W. Grimes, Iowa governor and senator
 Dan Grimm, football player
 Harold R. Gross, politician
 Danai Gurira, actress
 Janet Guthrie, auto racer

H

 Charlie Haden, musician
 Mike Haight, football player
 Leslie Hall, rapper
 Jack Halloran, composer
 Scot Halpin, musician
 Halston, fashion designer
 Adam Haluska, basketball player
 Andy Haman, professional bodybuilder
 Jack Hamilton, baseball player
 Milo Hamilton, baseball broadcaster
 Edward Hammatt, architect
 Ryan Hannam, football player
 Joel Hanrahan, baseball player
 Bob Hansen, basketball player
 James Hansen, professor
 Juanita Hansen, actress
 Niels Ebbesen Hansen, botanist
 Robert Hansen, convicted murderer
 Haldor Johan Hanson, hymn composer
 William L. Harding, former governor of Iowa
 Tom Harkin, Iowa senator
 Bob Harlan, pro football executive
 James Harlan, politician
 Graham Harman, professor
 Hill Harper, actor
 Frank Hatton, politician
 Tim Hauff, jazz musician
 Eva Lund Haugen, author
 James H. Hawley, Idaho politician
 Merle Hay, World War I soldier
 Frank Hayes, unionist
 Peter Hedges, writer
 Alan J. Heeger, Nobel Prize laureate in chemistry
 Jeremy Hellickson, baseball player
 Stephen P. Hempstead, former governor of Iowa
 John Hench, associate of Walt Disney
 David B. Henderson, politician, Speaker of the House
 Dorothy Hennessey, nun, activist
 Gwen Hennessey, nun, activist
 John Hennessy, religious leader
 Chad Hennings, football player
 William Peters Hepburn, Civil War officer, politician
 Francis J. Herron, Civil War general
 Daniel Hess, inventor
 Phil Hester, comic book artist
 James C. Hickman, actuary
 David Anthony Higgins, actor
 Steve Higgins, writer, comedian, actor, and announcer on The Tonight Show Starring Jimmy Fallon
 Harriet Hilliard, actress
 David C. Hilmers, astronaut
 A. J. Hinch, baseball player, manager
 Kirk Hinrich, basketball player
 Herbert E. Hitchcock, South Dakota politician
 J.B.E. Hittle, decorated intelligence officer, author and writer
 Tami Hoag, novelist
 Terry Hoage, football player
 Thomas M. Hoenig, financier
 Bill Hoffer, baseball player
 Fred Hoiberg, basketball player, coach
 Judd Holdren, actor
 Ducky Holmes, baseball player
 Lizzie Holmes, educator, anarchist 
 Elmer G. Homrighausen, theologian
 Herbert Hoover, 31st President of the United States
 Lou Henry Hoover, First Lady
 Harry Hopkins, presidential adviser
 Frank O. Horton, politician
 Austin Howard, football player
 Walter Howey, journalist
 Jerome Clarke Hunsaker, zeppelin authority
 Mary Beth Hurt, actress
 Toby Huss, actor
 Dick Hutcherson, auto racer
 Libbie Hyman, zoologist

I
 Jim Inhofe, politician
 Inkpaduta, Native American chief
 Arnold J. Isbell, aviator

J

 Jacob Jaacks, basketball player
 Fred Jackman, cinematographer
 Selmer Jackson, actor
 Kip Janvrin, athlete
 N. K. Jemisin, science fiction/fantasy author
 Frank Jenks, actor
 Dan Jennings, baseball player
 Roger Jepsen, politician
 Jake Johannsen, comedian
 Donald Johanos, symphony conductor
 Bryce Johnson, actor
 Dorothy M. Johnson, author
 Edwin S. Johnson, politician
 Georgann Johnson, actress
 Lulu Johnson, historian
 Nicholas Johnson, FCC commissioner
 Royal C. Johnson, politician
 Shawn Johnson, gymnast
 Zach Johnson, golfer
 Peter Jok, § basketball player
 Craig Jones, musician
 George Wallace Jones 
 Gordon Jones, actor
 James Jones, football player
 Lolo Jones, athlete
 Kathryn Joosten, actress
 Joey Jordison, musician
 Duane Josephson, baseball player
 Patty Judge, politician
 Jerry Junkins, CEO of Texas Instruments

K

 Nate Kaeding, football placekicker
 Danielle Kahle, figure skater
 Jacqui Kalin (born 1989), American-Israeli professional basketball player
 Aaron Kampman, football player
 MacKinlay Kantor, journalist, author
 Gail Karp, cantor
 Bradley Kasal, decorated U.S. Marine
 John A. Kasson, politician
 Hazel Keener, actress
 James M. Kelly, astronaut
 Percy R. Kelly, judge
 Keokuk, Sauk chief
 John H. Kemble, professor
 Charles Reuben Keyes, archaeologist
 Charles Rollin Keyes, geologist
 Hugh Kidder, decorated U.S. Marine
 Kerry Killinger, banker
 Angela Jia Kim, classical pianist
 Mitch King, football player
 Rebecca Ann King, 1974 Miss America
 Steve King, politician
 Dallas Kinney, journalist
 Nile Kinnick, football player
 James T. Kirk, fictional character
 Samuel J. Kirkwood, § governor, senator, U.S. Secretary of the Interior
 Philip J. Klass, UFO researcher
 Stephen Kline, artist
 Bradford Knapp, university president
 Corina Knoll, journalist
 Ruth Kobart, performer
 Matt Koch, baseball player
 Bonnie Koloc, singer
 Jon Koncak, basketball player
 Ted Kooser, poet
 Dan Koppen, football player
 Kyle Korver, basketball player
 Joseph Kosinski, commercial director
 Mitch Krebs, television journalist
 Gary Kroeger, actor
 Josh Kroeger, baseball player
 Matt Kroul, football player
 Ashton Kutcher, actor

L

 Jerry Lacy, actor
 Perry Lafferty, television producer
 Doug La Follette, politician
 Raef LaFrentz, basketball player
 Roswell Lamson, Civil War officer
 Ann Landers, advice columnist
 The Lane Sisters, singers, actresses
 Harry Langdon, comedian
 Frank Lanning, actor
 Jeff Larish, baseball player
 Patty Larkin, singer
 Robert Larsen, founder and director of Des Moines Metro Opera and professor emeritus of music at Simpson College
 Mauricio Lasansky, graphic artist
 Tomas Lasansky, visual artist
 Joe Laws, basketball player
 Elmer Layden, football player, coach
 Jim Leach, politician
 Cloris Leachman, actress
 Frederick Leadbetter, financier
 William Daniel Leahy, naval officer
 William P. Leahy, university president
 Frances Lee, actress
 Gerald Leeman, Olympic freestyle wrestler
 Laura Leighton, actress
 Josh Lenz, football player
 Aldo Leopold, environmentalist
 Amy Leslie, opera singer
 Alexander Levi, religious leader
 Jack Lewis, screenwriter
 John Lewis, labor leader
 Jon Lieber, baseball player
 Thurlow Lieurance, composer
 Joe Lillard, athlete
 Edward Lindberg, athlete
 Everett Franklin Lindquist, educator
 Everett Lindsay, football player
 Margaret Lindsay, actress
 Ron Livingston, actor
 Bob Locker, baseball player
 Al Lohman, radio personality
 Babe London, comedian
 Chuck Long, football player, coach
 Nia Long, § actress
 Mathias Loras, religious leader
 Tyler Lorenzen, football player
 Kevin Love, auto racer
 Phyllis Love, actress
 Herschel C. Loveless, governor
 Robert Lucas, politician
 Larry Lujack, radio personality
 Tiny Lund, auto racer
 Mike Lynch, cartoonist
 Raymond J. Lynch, judge
 Emmett Lynn, actor
 Sue Lyon, actress

M

 Larry Mac Duff, football coach
 Archer MacMackin, film director
 Hanford MacNider, diplomat, U.S. Army general
 Cletus Madsen, religious leader
 Joe Magrane, baseball player
 Maryann Mahaffey, politician
 Ryan Mahaffey, football player
 Mahaska, Native American chief
 Dennis Mahony, 19th-century journalist
 Anna Malle, § adult film actress
 Jessie Wilson Manning, writer, lecturer 
 Arabella Mansfield, lawyer
 Stuart Margolin, actor
 Beth Marion, actress
 Glenn Martin, aviator
 Bernard Masterson, athlete
 Jerry Mathers, actor
 James Matheson, composer
 David Maxwell, university president
 Elsa Maxwell, columnist
 Marilyn Maxwell, actress
 Jesse May, poker professional
 Wiley Mayne, politician
 F. L. Maytag, founder of Maytag corporation
 Rita McBride, sculptor
 C. W. McCall, singer and politician
 Dan McCarney, football coach
 The McCaughey septuplets
 Tim McClelland, baseball umpire
 Al McCoy, announcer
 Greg McDermott, basketball coach
 William John McGee, geologist
 George McGill, politician
 Charles McGraw, actor
 Keli McGregor, baseball executive
 Pat McLaughlin, singer
 Sean McLaughlin, meteorologist
 William H. McMaster, former governor of South Dakota
 Cal McVey, baseball player
 Stu Mead, painter
 Carl Meinberg, priest
 John Melcher, former senator of Montana 
 Michael Joseph Melloy, judge
 Denis Menke, baseball player
 Sebastian Menke, priest
 William Menster, priest
 Iris Meredith, actress
 Frank Merriam, former governor of California
 Russel Merrill, aviator
 Samuel Merrill, former governor of Iowa
 Nancy Metcalf, volleyball player
 Bernard F. Meyer, missionary
 Loren Meyer, basketball player
 Julia Michaels, singer-songwriter
 Brandon Middleton, football player
 Pat Miletich, MMA fighter, member of the UFC Hall of Fame
 Hugh Millen, football player
 Glenn Miller, musician, bandleader, World War II officer
 Samuel Freeman Miller, Supreme Court justice
 Robert Millikan, physicist
 Jason Momoa, § actor
 Ted Monachino, football coach
 Michelle Monaghan, actress
 Jordan Monroe, model
 Constance Moore, actress
 Frank A. Moore, judge
 Hap Moran, football player
 Peggy Moran, actress
 Karen Morley, actress
 Carol Morris, Miss Universe 1956
 Mike Morris, football player
 Phil Morris, actor
 Allie Morrison, Olympic freestyle wrestler
 Honoré Willsie Morrow, author, editor
 Karen Morrow, actress
 John Mosher, jazz musician and composer
 Michael Mosley, actor
 Dow Mossman, writer
 John Mott, YMCA leader, Nobel Prize winner
 Marvin Mottet, priest
 Kate Mulgrew, actress
 Richard L. Murphy, former Iowa senator
 Charles Murray, political scientist
 Brandon Myers, football player
 Virginia A. Myers, inventor

N

 Nancy Naeve, television journalist
 Conrad Nagel, actor
 Neapope, Sauk leader
 Sharon Needles, drag performer
 Brad Nelson, baseball player
 George Nelson, NASA astronaut
 Harriet Nelson, actress, television personality
 Larry Nemmers, football official
 Carman A. Newcomb, politician
 Jim Nicholson, politician
 Bruce Nissen, professor
 Ken Nordine, voice-over artist
 Lance Norris, actor
 Bill Northey, politician
 Robert Noyce, inventor
 Michael Nunn, boxer
 Nick Nurse, basketball head coach

O

 Randi Oakes, actress, fashion model
 Dick Oatts, musician
 Wes Obermueller, baseball player
 Patrick O'Bryant, basketball player
 Brian O'Connor, § baseball coach
 Dennis O'Keefe, actor
 Gerald Francis O'Keefe, religious leader
 Bob Oldis, baseball player, coach, scout
 George Olmsted, military officer
 Eric Christian Olsen, actor
 Zoe Ann Olsen-Jensen, Olympic diver
 James Bradley Orman, former governor of Colorado
 Kay A. Orr, former governor of Nebraska
 Kyle Orton, football player
 Charles Osborne, "hiccup" man
 Vivienne Osborne, actress
 Beverley Owen, actress

P

 Stephen Paddock, mass murderer
 Daniel David Palmer, chiropractic medicine pioneer
 Francis W. Palmer, publisher
 Rose Marie Pangborn, scientist
 Oran Pape, law enforcement officer
 Ralph Parcaut, professional wrestler
 Sara Paretsky, novelist
 Charles Fox Parham, evangelist
 Anthony Parker, basketball player
 Clair Cameron Patterson, geochemist
 Neva Patterson, actress
 Allen E. Paulson, thoroughbred breeder
 Bryce Paup, football player
 Claude Payton, actor
 Maria Pearson, Dakota activist
 Sally Pederson, former lieutenant governor
 Paul Peek, politician
 Mary Beth Peil, actress
 Nat Pendleton, athlete, actor
 Arthur D. Pennington, baseball player
 Tom Pepper, computer programmer
 Don Perkins, football player
 Edwin Perkins, inventor
 Roger Perry, actor
 Pete Peterson, combat pilot, ambassador
 Roger Peterson, pilot
 Joseph M. Petrick, screenwriter
 Lori Petty, actress
 James Philbrook, actor
 John Robinson Pierce, engineer
 Mark Pinter, actor
 Chris Pirillo, video host, blogger
 Ed Podolak, football player
 Carl Pohlad, financier, Minnesota Twins owner 
 George Pomutz, Civil War general
 Maddie Poppe, musician and winner of American Idol season 16
 Scott Pose, baseball player
 Dante Powell, stand-up comedian
 Gordon Prange, historian
 Beatrice Prentice, actress
 Hiram Price, railroad president, politician
 Richard Proenneke, naturalist
 Stanley Prusiner, neurologist, biochemist
 Tom Purtzer, golfer

Q
 Quashquame, Sauk chief
 John Herbert Quick, author
 Howard 'Howdy' Quicksell, musician
 Linnea Quigley, actress

R

 David Rabe, playwright
 Frances Rafferty, actress
 Max Rafferty, writer, politician
 John F. Rague, architect
 Randy Rahe, basketball coach
 Josh Rand, musician
 Robert D. Ray, governor of Iowa (1969–1983) who served several consecutive terms
 Harry Reasoner, television journalist
 David Reed, football player
 Donna Reed, actress
 Dani Reeves, Miss Iowa 2007
 George Reeves, actor
 Allen Reisner, football player
 George C. Remey, Civil War admiral
 Walter E. Reno, World War II naval officer
 Kevin Rhomberg, baseball player
 Alfred C. Richmond, admiral
 Doug Riesenberg, football player
 William H. Riker, political scientist
 Bill Riley Sr., entertainer
 Jack Riley, football player, Olympic freestyle wrestler
 Chad Rinehart, football player
 The Ringling brothers, circus moguls
 Clifford Roberts, chairman of Masters golf tournament
 James B. A. Robertson, judge, Governor of Oklahoma
 Billy Robinson, aviator
 Shawna Robinson, auto racer
 Reggie Roby, football player
 Otto Frederick Rohwedder, inventor
 Seth Rollins, WWE professional wrestler
 Christine Romans, television journalist
 James Root, musician
 Jim Root, musician
 Raymond Roseliep, poet
 Sage Rosenfels, football player
 Joseph Rosenfield, lawyer
 Lawrence Sullivan Ross, Civil War general, governor of Texas
 Brandon Routh, actor
 Coleen Rowley, FBI agent, politician
 J. Craig Ruby, basketball coach
 Nate Ruess, singer
 Alexander Rummler, painter
 Nicholas J. Rusch, Civil War officer, politician
Arthur Russell, musician
 Charles Edward Russell, journalist
 Lillian Russell, actress
 Paul Rust, comedian
 George Ryan, former governor of Illinois

S

 George Saling, athlete
 Mark Salter, political speechwriter
 Josh Samman, mixed martial artist
 Ezekiel S. Sampson, Civil War officer, politician
 Cael Sanderson, § Olympic freestyle wrestler, wrestling coach
 Tyler Sash, football player
 Sauganash, fur trader
 A. J. Schable, football player
 Daniel Schaefer, politician
 Peter Schickele, parodist
 Ron Schipper, football coach
 Aloysius Schmitt, Navy chaplain
 Ernest B. Schoedsack, filmmaker
 Robert H. Schuller, religious leader
 Aloysius Schulte, college president
 Dick Schultz, NCAA and US Olympic Committee executive
 Jean Seberg, actress
 Brad Seely, football coach
 Edward Robert Sellstrom, pilot
 Phil Shafer, auto racer
 William Shannahan, priest
 Harrison Sheckler, pianist
 Kenny Shedd, football player
 Kate Shelley, railroad official
 Gene Sherman, sportscaster
 Randy Shilts, journalist
 Paul Shorey, scholar
 Loren Shriver, astronaut
 Lee Paul Sieg, university president
 Hal Skelly, actor
 Bill Smith, § Olympic freestyle wrestler
 Brian Smith, photographer
 Gerald W. Smith, author
 Hiram Y. Smith, politician
 Jerry Smith, golfer
 Mary Louise Smith, politician
 Neal Smith, politician
 Riley Smith, actor
 Virginia Smith, politician
 Warren Allen Smith, gay rights advocate
 Clement Smyth, religious leader
 William Smyth, politician
 Neta Snook, aviator
 Jamie Solinger, Miss Teen USA
 Harvey Sollberger, composer
 Phyllis Somerville, actress
 Hartzell Spence, military journalist
 Tracie Spencer, singer
 Kirk Speraw, basketball coach
 Darren Sproles, football player
 Josh Stamer, football player
 Edwin O. Stanard, politician
 Denise Stapley, Survivor champion, therapist
 Bradley Steffens, author
 William G. Steiner, child advocate
 Mark Steines, television personality
 Keith H. Steinkraus, food scientist
 Frank Steunenberg, Idaho governor
 Bill Stewart, jazz musician
 George F. Stewart, food scientist
 Kiah Stokes, basketball player
 George Stone (1876–1945), Major League Baseball left fielder; 1906 American League batting champion
 Ramo Stott, auto racer
 Terry Stotts, basketball coach
 George L. Stout, art historian, "Monuments Man"
 Russell Stover, candy manufacturer
 Alvin Straight, lawn-mower rider
 Chris Street, basketball player
 Jeff Streeter, auto racer
 Stephen Stucker, actor
 Bob Stull, football player
 Scott Swisher, legislator
 The Sullivan Brothers, combat veterans
 Billy Sunday, baseball player, evangelist
 Roderick Dhu Sutherland, politician
 Al Swearengen, Wild West saloonkeeper
 Ryan Sweeney, baseball player
 Quinn Sypniewski, football player
 Brett Szabo, basketball player

T

 Joseph Taggart, politician
 Taimah, Native American chief
 Michael Talbott, actor
 Kevin Tapani, baseball player
 Lawrie Tatum, U.S. "Indian Agent"
 Corey Taylor, musician
 Morgan Taylor, athlete
 Richard R. Taylor, Surgeon-General of the U.S. Army
 Sara Taylor, political public-relations professional
 Ashley Tesoro, actress, singer
 Kenneth W. Thompson, academic
 Sada Thompson, actress
 William Thompson, politician
 William George Thompson, politician
 Mick Thomson, musician
 Adam Timmerman, football player
 Matt Tobin, football player
 John Tomkins, criminal
 Alice Bellvadore Sams Turner, physician, writer

U
 James Ulmer, journalist
 Jarrod Uthoff, basketball player
 Sarah Utterback, actress

V

 James Van Allen, scientist
 Mike Van Arsdale, MMA fighter, wrestler 
 Dennis Van Roekel, labor leader
 Carl Van Vechten, writer, photographer
 Kyle Vanden Bosch, athlete
 Bob Vander Plaats, politician, activist
 Julian Vandervelde, athlete
 William Vandever, politician
 Oswald Veblen, mathematician
 Ross Verba, athlete
 Michelle Vieth, actress
 Zach Villa, actor, singer
 Phil Vischer, animator
 Krista Voda, sportscaster
 Nedra Volz, actress

W

 Michael Wacha, baseball player
 John Henry Waddell, painter and sculptor
 Hynden Walch, actress
 Nellie Walker, sculptor
 Joseph Frazier Wall, historian
 Henry A. Wallace, politician and presidential candidate
 Marcia Wallace, actress
 Will Walling, actor
 Adam Walsh, athlete and coach
 Chile Walsh, football player, coach, and executive
 Mark Walter, financier, chairman of Los Angeles Dodgers
 Rick Wanamaker, athlete
 Brian Wansink, scientist and professor
 Dedric Ward, football player, coach
 Everett Warner, painter and printmaker
 Kurt Warner, athlete
 Fitz Henry Warren, politician, Civil War general
 Kiersten Warren, actress
 Pierre Watkin, actor
 Watseka, Native Iowan
 James F. Watson, judge
 Tony Watson, athlete
 John Wayne, actor
 James B. Weaver, politician
 Randy Weaver, survivalist involved in Ruby Ridge incident
 Irving Weber, businessman
 Joseph Welch, attorney 
 Elmarie Wendel, actress
 Susan Werner, singer-songwriter
 Emily West, singer-songwriter
 Brooks Wheelan, actor, comedian
 Matthew Whitaker, district attorney
 John White, labor leader, president of the United Mine Workers
 Jim Whitesell, basketball coach
 Peggy Whitson, astronaut, scientist
 Casey Wiegmann, athlete
 Doreen Wilber, athlete
 Tom Wilkinson, athlete
 Andy Williams, singer
 Gregory Alan Williams, actor, author
 Roy Lee Williams, labor leader
 William Appleman Williams, historian
 William Williamson, politician
 Meredith Willson, composer
 James Falconer Wilson, politician
 JoAnn Wilson, murdered wife of Canadian politician
 Mortimer Wilson, composer
 Sid Wilson, disc jockey
 Wally Wingert, actor
 Charles E. Winter, politician
 Sidney G. Winter, economist 
 Johannes B. Wist, journalist, editor
 William P. Wolf, politician
 Elijah Wood, actor
 Grant Wood, painter
 Joey Woody, athlete
 Hank Worden, actor
 Carleton H. Wright, U.S. Navy admiral
 Frank Wykoff, athlete

Y
 Marshal Yanda, athlete
 Harry E. Yarnell, U.S. Navy admiral
 David Yost, actor and producer
 Ed Yost, inventor
 Nancy Youngblut, actor

Z
 Luke Zeller, basketball player
 Maurice Zimm, writer for screen and radio
 Larry Zox, painter and printmaker

See also 
 List of Iowa Hawkeyes football honorees
 List of Iowa State University people
 List of Iowa suffragists

References